The Centenary Sprint Cup is a Group 1 Thoroughbred horse race over a distance of 1200 metres at Sha Tin in January. 
It was originally known as the Centenary Cup, which was first run on 24 November 1984 to celebrate the centenary of The Hong Kong Jockey Club. It offers a purse of HK$10,000,000.

In the season of 2005/06, it becomes the first leg of the Hong Kong Speed Series (formerly the Champion Sprint Series). In 2017/2018 season, the race was promoted to Group 1 status.

Winners

See also
 List of Hong Kong horse races

References
Racing Post:

 The Hong Kong Jockey Club official website of Kent & Curwen Centenary Sprint Cup (2011/12)
 Racing Information of Kent & Curwen Centenary Sprint Cup (2011/12)
 The Hong Kong Jockey Club 

Horse races in Hong Kong